John David Jess,  (15 April 1922 – 18 October 2003) was an Australian politician.

Born in Melbourne, he was the son of Sir Carl Jess and Marjory Mary Jess ( McGibbon). Educated at Melbourne Grammar School, he was a lieutenant in the Citizens Military Force during the Second World War, serving in Melbourne and Queensland, before becoming an estate agent. He was elected to the Australian House of Representatives in a 1960 by-election for the seat of La Trobe, representing the Liberal Party. He held the seat until his defeat in 1972. He was instrumental in bringing about the second Royal Commission into the Melbourne–Voyager ship collision in 1964. He was known throughout his 12-year career in politics as the "Seeker of Justice" for his efforts in fighting for issues of justice. Jess died in 2003.

References

McCarthy (née Jess) E. (2015) John Jess Seeker of Justice the Role of the Parliament in the HMAS Voyager Tragedy

1922 births
2003 deaths
Liberal Party of Australia members of the Parliament of Australia
Members of the Australian House of Representatives for La Trobe
Members of the Australian House of Representatives
Australian Commanders of the Order of the British Empire
20th-century Australian politicians
Australian people of German descent